The Old Demon is a short story by Pearl S. Buck set during the Second Sino-Japanese War.

Publication details
The story is about Mrs.Wang, who was the eldest woman in her village, and how she sacrificed herself in order to save her family and village from the Japanese who were near her village. She describes the river as the old demon because she felt that whenever the river was unchecked,

1939 short stories
Works about the Second Sino-Japanese War
Works by Pearl S. Buck
Short stories set in China
North China in fiction
American short stories